Ralph Javier Guzman is a former reporter of GMA Network and from 2003 to 2010, and presently to the radio station in Cagayan. DZCV 684 Tuguegarao in 2016.

He covered the Malacañang Beat (Presidential Coverage).  He was previously assigned at the Philippine House of Representatives, having covered the second impeachment attempt on President Gloria Macapagal Arroyo after the congresses in the Philippines. In 2016 Guzman left to Manila and return to Tuguegarao City and Reassigned to public radio station DZCV 684 Tuguegarao he as an veteran anchor and reporter.

He produces stories for the Network's nationwide news programs.  He has also produced for the program, Reporter's Notebook, and is substitute anchor for GMA Flash Report.

Early life and education
Guzman was born and raised in Tuguegarao City, Cagayan. His parents are Prospero Guzman and Rosemarie Javier-Guzman. He is the youngest of 7 children, he came from a rich family.

He finished after his High School Department of University of Saint Louis Tuguegarao in 1998 and in his bachelor's degree at the University of the Philippines-Diliman in Quezon City in 2003.

Personal life
Guzman left to Manila and returning to Cagayan Valley and he married of 94.1 Love Radio Tuguegarao DJ Valerie Pamittan Sychangco on December 23, 2019. He resides in Tuguegarao City, Cagayan.

See also
GMA News and Public Affairs
DZCV 684 Tuguegarao
Official Site

1980 births
Living people
People from Tuguegarao
University of the Philippines alumni
Filipino television journalists
GMA Network personalities
GMA Integrated News and Public Affairs people